Jong Jo-ung (born 17 June 1957) is a North Korean boxer. He competed at the 1976 Summer Olympics and the 1980 Summer Olympics. At the 1980 Summer Olympics, he defeated Rabani Ghulam of Afghanistan, before losing to Viktor Demyanenko of the Soviet Union.

References

1957 births
Living people
North Korean male boxers
Olympic boxers of North Korea
Boxers at the 1976 Summer Olympics
Boxers at the 1980 Summer Olympics
Place of birth missing (living people)
Asian Games medalists in boxing
Boxers at the 1978 Asian Games
Boxers at the 1982 Asian Games
Asian Games gold medalists for North Korea
Medalists at the 1982 Asian Games
Lightweight boxers